Elemer-György Tanko (born 11 October 1968) is a Romanian cross-country skier. He competed in the men's 10 kilometre classical event at the 1994 Winter Olympics.

References

1968 births
Living people
Romanian male cross-country skiers
Olympic cross-country skiers of Romania
Cross-country skiers at the 1994 Winter Olympics
People from Gheorgheni